Grant Wells (born August 8, 2000) is an American football quarterback for the Virginia Tech Hokies. He previously played for the Marshall Thundering Herd.

College career

Marshall 
As a redshirt freshman in 2020, Wells completed 165 of 270 passes for 2,091 yards and nine touchdowns. He was named to the Maxwell Award watch list prior to the 2021 season.

In 2021, Wells repeated as a redshirt freshman. During the regular season, he completed 280 of 419 passes for 3,433 yards, 16 touchdowns, and 12 interceptions. He ranked 12th in passing yards among all Division I FBS players.

Virginia Tech 
On January 6, 2022, Wells announced that he had transferred to Virginia Tech. On August 17, head coach Brent Pry announced that Wells would be the Hokies' week 1 starter against Old Dominion.

Statistics

References

External links 
 Marshall bio

Living people
American football quarterbacks
Marshall Thundering Herd football players
Sportspeople from Charleston, West Virginia
Players of American football from West Virginia
Virginia Tech Hokies football players
2000 births